National Primary Route 3, or just Route 3 (or ) is a National Road Route of Costa Rica, located in the San José, Alajuela, Heredia provinces.

Description
In San José province the route covers San José canton (Uruca district).

In Alajuela province the route covers Alajuela canton (Alajuela, San José, Río Segundo, Desamparados, Garita districts), San Mateo canton (San Mateo, Desmonte districts), Atenas canton (Atenas, Jesús, Concepción districts), Orotina canton (Orotina district).

In Heredia province the route covers Heredia canton (Heredia, Mercedes, San Francisco, Ulloa districts), Belén canton (La Ribera district), Flores canton (Llorente district).

References

Highways in Costa Rica